The Star Maker is a 1995 Italian film. It was produced by Rita Cecchi Gori, Vittorio Cecchi Gori, directed by Giuseppe Tornatore, while the title role was played by Sergio Castellitto. It won the Grand Jury Prize at the Venice Film Festival. It was nominated for the Academy Award for Best Foreign Language Film.

Plot
In 1953, Joe Morelli is traveling rural Sicily, offering to take screen tests of wannabe actors for a fee. He claims to work for big Roman film studios, but in reality he is a fraud. He meets several people who express their deepest feelings and secrets in front of the camera. At one of his stops he meets a young girl, Beata, a convent girl who becomes attached to him despite his protestations.

Joe and Beata's relationship gradually evolves into a romantic one, when he's exposed as a fraud, beaten, and arrested. After serving his prison term, Joe comes back to seek Beata, but finds her in a mentally disturbed state assuming Joe died. Pretending to be Joe's friend, he conveys to her a message that she was the love of his life, and promises he shall come back with money and take care of her.

Cast 
 Sergio Castellitto as Joe Morelli (Giuseppe Romolo)
 Tiziana Lodato as  Beata
 Leopoldo Trieste  as The Mute
 Leo Gullotta as Vito
 Franco Scaldati  as Brigadiere Mastropaolo
 Salvatore Billa as The Prince
 Jane Alexander as The Princess 
 Clelia Rondinella as  Anna's Mother
 Tony Sperandeo as Primo Badalamenti
 Tano Cimarosa as Bordanaro

Production
When filming began, Tiziana Lodato was still a minor, but she said she was already 18 when she played the explicit sex scene with Sergio Castellitto.

Release
Following its success at the Venice Film Festival, the film was released on 22 September 1995 in Italy, grossing $371,000 in its opening weekend from 49 screens in Italy's key cities.

See also
 List of submissions to the 68th Academy Awards for Best Foreign Language Film
 List of Italian submissions for the Academy Award for Best Foreign Language Film

References

External links
 
 The Star Maker at Variety Distribution

1995 films
Italian romantic drama films
1990s Italian-language films
Films set in Sicily
Films shot in Matera
Films about filmmaking
Films about fashion photographers
Venice Grand Jury Prize winners
Films directed by Giuseppe Tornatore
Films scored by Ennio Morricone
1990s Italian films